Uttarakhand is a state in the northern part of India. It is often referred to as the "Devbhumi" (literally 'Land of the Gods') due to its religious significance and numerous Hindu temples and pilgrimage sites found throughout the state. As a result, religious tourism forms a major portion of the tourism in the state. Uttarakhand is known for the natural environment of the Himalayas. 2019 Tourist Arrivals Domestic – 40,000,000 per/year and Foreigner – 150,000 per year. Tourism business in Uttarakhand generated  23,000 crores during 2013–14.

Chota Char Dham 

Uttarakhand is famous for Chota Char Dham, which literally meaning 'journey to four centres'. These four religious centers in Uttarakhand are represented by Badrinath (dedicated to Lord Vishnu), Kedarnath(dedicated to Lord Shiva), Gangotri (the holy origin of river Ganga) and Yamunotri (the holy origin of river Yamuna). Badrinath is part of the bigger Char Dham.

The Char Dham Yatra begins around the first to second week of May every year. These dates are announced in the national media. The base for the yatra is generally the Rishikesh town which has all the amenities available for pilgrims and tourists alike. Pilgrims and tourists generally book their journey through the local travel agents to all the four locations.

Badrinath
Badrinath is the abode of Lord Vishnu, who is called 'Badri Vishal', Badri the Big One. Legend has it that Badrinath was the abode of Lord Shiva, who used to reside there with his consort Parvati. It is Located in Chamoli District of Uttarakhand. Lord Vishnu happened to like the place and wished to reside there permanently, so He took the form of an infant and started crying inconsolably. Mother Parvati's heart melted and she picked up the infant Vishnu and started cradling Him. The crying of the infant, however, disturbed the meditation of Lord Shiva and unable to bear the crying He left for higher reaches of the Himalayas and made Kedarnath His home. Once Lord Shiva left, Mother Parvati too followed, which gave an opportunity to Lord Vishnu to take His original form and remain at Badrinath forever. The priests of Badrinath are from the southernmost part of India, i.e. Kerala. This is according to the rules laid down by Adi Shankara. Badrinath remains out of bounds for pilgrims for 6 months a year, from October to May.

Kedarnath
Kedarnath is the abode of Lord Shiva. Kedarnath is one of the 12 Jyotirlingams of India and the only one in the Uttarakhand. While there is a motorable road to Badrinath, Kedarnath could only be reached by foot. The 18 km trek begins from Gaurikund. After the 2013 Himalayan floods, the trek currently is of more than 18 km due to washing away of trekking paths.

Gangotri
Gangotri is the origin of the holy Ganga. Ganga is revered as a mother throughout India. According to the Hindu philosophy, a place considered extremely holy if a river running through it flows in the northern direction. Gangotri is a place which is not only the origin of Ganga but also where Ganga flows in a northerly direction, hence the name Gangotri. The river Ganga flows out from the melting Gangotri glacier, which is at a distance of around 18 km from the Gangotri town. Close to the temple is Bhagirath Shila, which according to the Hindu philosophy is the place where Bhagirath did penance for 5500 years to seek the blessings of Mother Ganga and requested her to descend to the Earth from her heavenly abode to cleanse the sins of his ancestors.

Yamunotri
Yamunotri is the origin of the holy river Yamuna. A temple dedicated to the holy river Yamuna is situated at the place. The actual origin of the river is the Yamunotri glacier further up into the Himalayas where very few pilgrims go due to the difficulty it entails.

Lakes of Kumaon Hills 

The Kumaon region of uttarakhand is home to several freshwater lakes. Most of these lakes are situated in Nainital district, due to which, Nainital is also known as the Lake district of India, and four of them – Nainital, Bhimtal, Naukuchiatal and Sattal (which is a collection of seven different lakes viz Purna Tal, Ram Tal, Sita Tal, Laxman Tal, Nal Damayanti Tal, Sukha Tal and Garud Tal) are under restoration with funds provided by the National Lake Conservation Plan (NLCP) of the Government of India. Other prominent lakes in the region include Khurpatal, Sariyatal, Malwatal and Kamaltal.

Other attractions

Rishikesh

Rishikesh has been a magnet for spiritual seekers since the late 60's when The Beatles rocked up Maharishi Mahesh Yogi's ashram. Known as the 'Yoga Capital of the World' because of the large number of ashrams teaching meditation and yoga. The northern part of the main town is the hotspot for all the action where the Ganges forested hills form a conducive environment for all the meditation. The evening aarti also draws a lot of crowd.

Rishikesh also draws a lot of adventure sports lovers for Rafting, Bungee Jumping and Camping adventures on the banks of River Ganges.

Haridwar
Haridwar is an important city in the religious architecture of the country. The large number of people gathering on the bathing ghats on the holy Ganges river gives the place a chaotic feel. There are a number of Hindu temples, ashrams and dharamshalas (pilgrims' rest houses) in the city. The city also serves as the entry point to the nearby Rajaji National Park.

Tehri Dam 
With a height of 260.5 m (855 ft) Tehri Dam is the tallest dam in India. It is currently ranked No 10 on the List of Tallest Dams in the world. With a total planned installed capacity of 2400 MW, it's the biggest Hydroelectric power plant in India on the Bhagirathi River in New Tehri, Tehri Garhwal district.

National Parks and Bio Reserves

Uttarakhand is home to the Jim Corbett National Park, the first national park in India. This park attracts about 500,000 tourists every year(in 1999). There are 12 National Parks and Wildlife Sanctuaries covering 13.8 percent of the total area of the state.   
Nanda Devi Biosphere reserve and Valley of Flowers National Park are UNESCO World Heritage sites.

Also, people visit Jim Corbett in large numbers for Jeep and Canter Safari.

Hill Stations

Mussoorie 
Mussoorie, also known as the Queen of Hills, is one of the most popular hill stations in the country. This tourist destination, located 35 km from Dehradun, is known for its beautiful views of the Himalayan ranges. Being situated at an altitude of about 2,005 meters (6,578 ft) above sea level, the climate here is cool and temperate. Mussoorie is also known for its major tourist spots, such as the Mall Road, Lal Tibba, Picture Palace, Library Chowk, Jari Pani and George Everest, surrounded by colonial-era bungalows and churches.

Dhanaulti 
Dhanaulti, about 35 km from Mussoorie, is a hill station in the Tehri Garhwal district of Uttarakhand. It is situated in the Himalayan mountain range at an altitude of about 2,250 meters above sea level and is known for its beautiful views and lush green forests of deodar. Dhanaulti is a popular destination for adventure activities like trekking, camping, and ziplining. The city is also known for its ecotourism initiatives, such as the Surkanda Devi Temple and the Dhanaulti Adventure Park.

Auli 
Auli is a hill station and ski Destination located in the Chamoli district of Uttarakhand. It is situated in the Himalayan mountain range at an altitude of about 2,909 meters above sea level. It is known for its snow-capped slopes and beautiful views of the surrounding peaks. Auli is located at a distance of about 10 km from Joshimath, which serves as the base town for Auli. Auli is also a popular base for trekking, skiing, camping and other outdoor activities in the surrounding area.

Nainital 
Known as the "City of Lakes," Nainital is a picturesque hill station situated at an altitude of about 2,084 meters above sea level and the foothills of the Kumaon Range. The main attractions of Nainital city are situated around the natural freshwater lake named Naini Lake. The lake is surrounded by hills and pine forests and is a popular spot for boating and other water sports. This hill station is known for its Mall Road, a popular shopping and dining area. Nainital attracts tourists with its many colonial-era bungalows and churches, home to a cool, temperate climate.

Chakrata 
Chakrata is a hill station and cantonment located in the Dehradun district of Uttarakhand. It is situated in the Himalayan mountain range at an altitude of about 2,118 meters above sea level and is known for its beautiful views and lush green forests. Located about 100 km from the capital Dehradun, this place is ideal for trekking, camping and other outdoor activities. The city is also home to Tiger Falls, which attracts many tourists. Chakrata is known for its salubrious climate and is a popular weekend getaway for people living in nearby cities.

Munsiyari 
Munsiyari is a unique hill village situated amidst the snowy ranges of Pithoragarh district, which remains covered with snow most of the time. It is situated in the Himalayan mountain range at an altitude of about 2,200 meters above sea level and is known for its beautiful scenery and lush green forests. The city is also known for its local cuisine and handicrafts. The climate of Munsiyari is cool and temperate, the atmosphere here drenches everyone who comes.

Fairs and festivals

Haridwar Kumbh Mela (fair) is a major tourist attraction to the state. Haridwar is one of the four places in India where this takes place. Haridwar also has its big annual fair in the form of Magh Mela in January–February which turns into a bigger event every 6 years in the form of Ardh Magh Mela. Nanda Devi Mela and Nanda Devi Raj Yatra are great festivals of Uttarakhand, famous in all northern India. Nanda Devi Mela and Raj Yatra are the festivals of the goddess Nanda Devi, the bless-giving goddess. Kumaoni Holi a regional variant of the Hindu festival of Holi is also very well known.

Panch Prayag

Panch Prayag is an expression in Hindu religious ethos, specifically used to connote the five sacred river confluences in the Garhwal Himalayas in the state of Uttarakhand, India. The five prayags – prayag meaning "confluence" in Sanskrit – also termed as "Prayag pentad", namely the five river confluences, are Vishnu Prayag, Nand Prayag, Karn prayag, Rudra Prayag and Dev Prayag, in the descending flow sequence of their occurrence.

Vishnu Prayag
The Alaknanda River, which originates in the eastern slopes of glacier fields of Chaukhamba, is joined by the Saraswathi River near Mana (that originates on the south from the international border), and then flows in front of the Badrinath temple, one of the most revered Hindu shrines. Legend narrates the worship offered by sage Narada to god Vishnu at this confluence. An octagonal shaped temple – located near the confluence – dated to 1889, is credited to Maharani of Indore – Ahalyabai. Though originally built to install a Shiva linga, it now houses a Vishnu image. A stairway from this temple leads to the Vishnu kund (kund means pool of water or lake) at the confluence, which is seen in a tranquil state.

Nanda Prayag
Nand Prayag  is the second prayag in the cascade sequence of the confluences where the Nandakini River joins the main Alaknanda River. According to one tale, a noble King Nanda performed Yagnya (fire-sacrifice) and sought blessings of God. Hence, the confluence is named after him. The other version of the legend states that the confluence derives its name from the Yadava king Nanda, the foster-father of god Krishna. According to the legend, Vishnu granted a boon of the birth of a son to Nanda and his wife Yashoda and also the same boon to Devaki, wife of Vasudeva. Placed in a dilemma, since both were his disciples, he ensured that Krishna, an incarnation of Vishnu, was born to Devaki and Vasudeva but was fostered by Yashoda and Nanda. There is temple for Gopal, a form of Krishna, here. The legends also narrate that sage Kanva did penance here and also that wedding of King Dushyanta and Shakuntala took place at this venue.

Karna Prayag
Karn Prayag  is the location where Alaknanda River is joined by the Pindar River that originates from the Pindar glacier, below the Nanda Devi hill range. The epic Mahabharata legend narrates that Karna did penance here and earned the protective gear of Kavacha (armour) and Kundala (ear rings) from his father, the Sun god, which gave him indestructible powers. The name of the confluence is thus derived from the name of Karna. There is reference to this site in Meghaduta, a Sanskrit lyrical poetic drama written by the legendary poet Kalidasa, which attributes that Satopanth and Bhagirath glaciers joined here to form the Pindar River. Another classic work by the same author called the Abhijnana-shakuntala also mentions that Shakuntala and king Dushyanta's romantic daliance occurred here. It is also mentioned that Swami Vivekananda mediatated here for eighteen days.

The stone seat where Karna did penance is also seen here. A temple built in recent times to commemorate Karna has the deity of goddess Uma Devi (daughter of the Himalayas) here. The stone temple was rebuilt by guru Adi Shankaracharya. In the sanctum, the images of goddess Parvati, her consort Shiva and her elephant-headed son Ganesha are installed, next to that of Uma Devi, apart from Karna's image. A steep row of steps from the temple along a spur leads to the confluence point. And, down these steps, small shrines of Shiva and the Binayak Shila (the Ganesha stone) – that is believed to provide protection from danger –  are located. Once in 12 years, a procession of the image of Uma Devi is taken around a few villages in the sub-divisional town of Karnaprayag.

Rudra Prayag
At Rudra Prayag  the Alaknanda meets the Mandakini River. The confluence is named after god Shiva, who is also known as Rudra. According to a widely narrated legend, Shiva performed the Tandava here, Tandava is a vigorous dance that is the source of the cycle of creation, preservation, and dissolution. Shiva also played his favourite musical instrument the Rudra veena here. By playing the Veena, he enticed god Vishnu to his presence and converted him to water.

Another legend narrates that sage Narada had become conceited by his Veena playing skills. The gods requested Krishna in order to set things right. Krishna told Narada that Shiva and his consort Parvati were impressed by his musical talent. Narada was taken in by the praise and immediately set out to meet Shiva in the Himalayas. On the way at Rudra Prayag, he met several beautiful damsels called raginis (musical notes) who were disfigured and the reason for such disfigurement was squarely attributed to Narada playing his Veena. Hearing this, Narada felt humbled and surrendered before Shiva and decided to devote himself to learning music as disciple of Shiva.

According to another legend, the consort of Shiva – Sati was reborn as Parvati as the daughter of Himalaya, after she self-immolated herself in protest of the insult of Shiva. In spite of Himalaya's protests, Parvati performed rigorous penance to get the boon of becoming Shiva's wife in the new birth too.

Temples dedicated to Rudranath (Shiva) and goddess Chamunda are located here.

Dev Prayag
Dev Prayag  is the confluence of the two holy rivers, the Bhagirathi – the chief stream of the Ganges and the Alaknanda. It is the first Prayag on the way to Badrinath. Beyond this confluence, the river is known as Ganges. The holiness of this place is considered equal to the famous Triveni sangam confluence at Allahabad where the Ganges, Yamuna and Saraswati rivers merge.

The confluence of the Bhagirathi, which flows in rapids with strong currents meets a much calmer river in the Alaknanda and this has been vividly described by the British captain Raper as:
The contrast between the two rivers joining here is striking. The Bhaghirathi runs down a steep declivity with rapid force, roaring and foaming flowing over large fragments placed in its bed, while the placid, Alakananda, flowing, with a smooth, unruffled surface, gently winds round the point till, meeting with her turbulent consort, she is forcibly hurried down, and unites her clamours with the blustering current.

Panch Kedar
Panch Kedar refers to five Hindu temples or holy places of the Shaivite sect dedicated to god Shiva. They are located in the Garhwal Himalayan region in Uttarakhand, India. They are the subject of many legends that directly link their creation to Pandavas, the heroes of the Hindu epic Mahabharata.

The Kedarnath is the main temple, which is part of the four famous Chota Char Dhams (literally 'the small four abodes/seats') or pilgrimage centers of the Garhwal Himalayas; the other three dhams are the Badrinath, Yamunotri and Gangotri. Kedarnath is also one of the twelve Jyotirlingas.

The Garhwal region is also called the Kedar-Khanda after Kedar – the local name for Lord Shiva. The region abounds in emblems and aniconic forms of Shiva sect of Lord Shiva, much more than the Vaishnava sect. The western part of this region in particular, which constitutes half of Chamoli district being known as Kedar-Kshetra or Kedar mandala, encompasses in its ambit all the five temples constituting the Panch Kedar.

Legend of Panch Kedar
The most famous folk legend about Panch Kedar relates to the Pandavas, the heroes of the Hindu epic Mahabharata. The Pandavas defeated and killed their cousins – the Kauravas in the epic Kurukshetra war. They wished to atone for the sins of committing fratricide (gotra hatya) and Brāhmanahatya (killing of Brahmins – the priest class) during the war. Thus, they handed over the reins of their kingdom to their kin and left in search of the god Shiva and to seek his blessings. First, they went to the holy city of Varanasi (Kashi), believed to Shiva's favourite city and famous for its Shiva temple. But, Shiva wanted to avoid them as he was deeply incensed by the death and dishonesty at the Kurukshetra war and was, therefore, insensitive to Pandavas' prayers. Therefore, he assumed the form of a bull (Nandi) and hid in the Garhwal region.

Not finding Shiva in Varanasi, the Pandavas went to Garhwal Himalayas. Bhima, the second of the five Pandava brothers, then standing astride two mountains started to look for Shiva. He saw a bull grazing near Guptakashi ("hidden Kashi" – the name derived from the hiding act of Shiva). Bhima immediately recognized the bull to be Shiva. Bhima caught hold of the bull by its tail and hind legs. But the bull-formed Shiva disappeared into the ground to later reappear in parts, with the hump raising in Kedarnath, the arms appearing in Tunganath, the nabhi (navel) and stomach surfacing in Madhyamaheshwar, the face showing up at Rudranath and the hair and the head appearing in Kalpeshwar. The Pandavas pleased with this reappearance in five different forms, built temples at the five places for venerating and worshipping Shiva. The Pandavas were thus freed from their sins. It is also believed that the fore portions of Shiva appeared at Pashupatinath, Kathmandu – the capital of Nepal.

A variant of the tale credits Bhima of not only catching the bull, but also stopping it from disappearing. Consequently, the bull was torn asunder into five parts and appeared at five locations in the Kedar Khand of Garhwal region of the Himalayas. After building the Panch Kedar temples, the Pandavas mediated at Kedarnath for salvation, performed yagna (fire sacrifice) and then through the heavenly path called the Mahapanth (also called Swargarohini), attained heaven or salvation.

After completing the pilgrimage of Lord Shiva's darshan at the Panch Kedar temples, it is an unwritten religious rite to visit Lord Vishnu at the Badrinath Temple, as a final affirmatory proof by the devotee that he has sought blessings of Lord Shiva.

References

Uttarakhand Tourism

External links

 
Rafting
Whitewater sports
Water sports in India
Bungee jumping